Kathleen Lockhart Manning (24 October 1890 – 20 March 1951) was an American composer. She was born on a ranch in Hollywood, California, and studied piano and composition in Paris with Moritz Moszkowski, and later with Elizabeth Jordan Eichelberger and de Sales. She sang during the 1911-1912 season with the Hammerstein Opera Company in London and also performed in the United States. After her husband died in 1938, she suffered from mental illness. She died in Los Angeles.

Works
Lockhart was noted for vocal compositions and wrote her own texts. Selected works include:
Sketches of Paris song cycle
Sketches of New York, song cycle
Operetta in Mozartian Style
For the Soul of Rafael
Japanese Ghost Songs
Chinese Impressions 
Two Sketches of Childhood 
The Tale the Garden Told 
Autumn Leaves 
Nostalgia
The Truant
Chinois
Prayer
Departed

Her works have been recorded and issued on CD, including:
To The Mart Of Dreams: Songs By Kathleen Lockhart Manning, Vol. 1

References

1890 births
1951 deaths
20th-century classical composers
American women classical composers
American classical composers
American music educators
American women music educators
20th-century American women musicians
20th-century American composers
20th-century women composers